Menegazzia aucklandica is a species of foliose lichen from New Zealand. It was described as new to science by David Galloway and Peter James in 1983.

See also
List of Menegazzia species

References

aucklandica
Lichen species
Lichens described in 1983
Lichens of New Zealand
Taxa named by David Galloway (botanist)
Taxa named by Peter Wilfred James